Éric Prodon the first edition of the tournament, defeating Nikola Ćirić 6–1, 6–3 in the final.

Seeds

Draw

Finals

Top half

Bottom half

References
 Main Draw
 Qualifying Draw

BNP Paribas Polish Open - Singles